The Iranian ambassador in Yerevan is the official representative of the Government in Tehran to the Government of Armenia.

List of representatives

See also
Armenia–Iran relations

References 

 
Armenia
Iran